Atkinson is a town in Pender County, North Carolina, United States. At the 2010 census, the town population was 299. It is part of the Wilmington Metropolitan Statistical Area.

Geography
Atkinson is located at  (34.527725, -78.169913).

Demographics

As of the census of 2000, there were 236 people, 106 households, and 71 families residing in the town. The population density was 238.5 people per square mile (92.0/km2). There were 117 housing units at an average density of 118.3 per square mile (45.6/km2). The racial makeup of the town was 89.41% White and 10.59% African American. Hispanic or Latino of any race were 2.12% of the population.

There were 106 households, out of which 25.5% had children under the age of 18 living with them, 54.7% were married couples living together, 8.5% had a female householder with no husband present, and 32.1% were non-families. 30.2% of all households were made up of individuals, and 14.2% had someone living alone who was 65 years of age or older. The average household size was 2.23 and the average family size was 2.76.

In the town, the population was spread out, with 21.6% under the age of 18, 8.1% from 18 to 24, 25.4% from 25 to 44, 27.1% from 45 to 64, and 17.8% who were 65 years of age or older. The median age was 40 years. For every 100 females, there were 82.9 males. For every 100 females age 18 and over, there were 88.8 males.

The median income for a household in the town was $34,375, and the median income for a family was $45,417. Males had a median income of $30,417 versus $22,813 for females. The per capita income for the town was $18,135. About 4.6% of families and 10.0% of the population were below the poverty line, including 13.7% of those under the age of eighteen and 10.5% of those 65 or over.  In 2017 the town elected Ken Smith as Mayor.  Smith won with 70% of the vote.  Gary Alsup, Lorie Floyd and Dee Turner were elected to serve on the town board of commissioners.

References

Towns in North Carolina
Towns in Pender County, North Carolina
Cape Fear (region)